The initialism NSM may refer to:

In general culture
 National Socialist Movement (disambiguation), a name used by a number of neo-Nazi organizations
 New social movements, social movements which depart significantly from the conventional social movement paradigm
 Non-Stipendiary Minister, an unpaid priest in the Church of England and Church of Ireland
 New Socialist Movement, a political party in Gujarat that was registered in June 2007
 New Sector Movements, a music project fronted by the British musician IG Culture
 Leonardo Crvenković, was once a part of NSM, now he works for GMZ

In science
 National Science Museum of Japan collection code
 Natural semantic metalanguage
 New Smoking Material, tobacco substitutes such as Cytrel
 Neurogenic Stunned Myocardium (see article at NLM)

In business
 Nack, Schulze und Menke, a German manufacturer of jukeboxes
 NASDAQ Stock Market (occasionally used three-letter abbreviation)

In computing
 N-ary Storage Model, a model to store records in database management systems
 Network and Systems Management (NSM), a Suite of Network and Computer Management software made by Computer Associates
 Network security monitor: see Intrusion detection system
 Network Status Monitor protocol, used to notify Network File System peers of reboots

Other
 Norseman Airport, IATA airport code "NSM"
 Nasjonal Sikkerhetsmyndighet, the Norwegian National Security Authority
 Naval Strike Missile, a cruise missile developed by Kongsberg Defence & Aerospace 1997–2007
 Nausena Medal, Indian Military Award
 Natural semantic metalanguage - A linguistic theory of semantic description
 New Seasons Market, a chain of grocery stores
Nipple-sparing Mastectomy, a type of breast removal surgery that conserves the areola to facilitate breast reconstruction procedures